Thyroid artery can refer to:
 the Inferior thyroid artery
 the Superior thyroid artery
 the Thyroid ima artery